Delena is a genus of South Pacific huntsman spiders that was first described by Charles Athanase Walckenaer in 1837.

Species
 it contains eleven species, found in New Zealand and Australia:
Delena cancerides Walckenaer, 1837 (type) – Australia, Tasmania, New Zealand
Delena convexa (Hirst, 1991) – Australia (Western Australia)
Delena craboides Walckenaer, 1837 – Australia
Delena gloriosa (Rainbow, 1917) – Australia (South Australia)
Delena kosciuskoensis (Hirst, 1991) – Australia (New South Wales)
Delena lapidicola (Hirst, 1991) – Australia (Western Australia)
Delena loftiensis (Hirst, 1991) – Australia (South Australia)
Delena melanochelis (Strand, 1913) – Australia (Victoria)
Delena nigrifrons (Simon, 1908) – Australia (Western Australia)
Delena spenceri (Hogg, 1903) – Australia (Tasmania, King Is.)
Delena tasmaniensis (Hirst, 1991) – Australia (Tasmania)

See also
 List of Sparassidae species

References

Araneomorphae genera
Sparassidae
Spiders of Australia
Spiders of New Zealand
Taxa named by Charles Athanase Walckenaer